Prevoicing, in phonetics, is voicing before the onset of a consonant or beginning with the onset of the consonant but ending before its release.

(See aspirated voiced consonant and voiced ejective.)

Kelabit has a similar set of aspirated voiced consonants. Not all speakers produce the aspiration, resulting in prevoiced (or mixed voiced)  (or equivalently , and neighboring Lun Dayeh has  (= .

References 

Phonetics